Wagle is a surname that occurs in multiple cultures.

 It is one of the common surnames from Coastal Karnataka, Goan region of India. It is found to be one of the surname/family name (Upanama) amongst the Konkani Saraswat Brahmin (Mostly Rajapur Saraswat Brahmins and Goud Saraswat Brahmins). They speak the Goan/Mangalorean or Malvani Konkani dialect. 
 Wagle (Wagale) is a family name of the Konkani community in the states of Maharashtra and Goa.

 In Nepal, the surname "Wagle" is used by the Brahman community.

 In Norway, Wagle may be a habitational name derived from farmsteads in Rogaland named Vagle, from the Old Norse "vagl" meaning a ‘perch’ or ‘roost’, with reference to a high ridge between two lakes.

The name Wagle may refer to:

Finn Wagle (born 1941), Norwegian bishop
Narayan Wagle (born 1968), Nepali journalist and writer
Nikhil Wagle (born 1959), Indian journalist 
Susan Wagle (born 1953), American politician
Swarnim Wagle (born 1974), Nepali economist and policymaker
Tellef Wagle (1883–1957), Norwegian sailor
Sukrutha Wagle  (born 1992), Indian actress

Other uses
Wagle Estate, industrial district in Thane, India
Wagle Ki Duniya, an Indian television series

Surnames